Coulsdon Cricket Club was an English cricket club based at Coulsdon in Surrey. The club is believed to have been formed in the early 1760s and it had for a time a great rivalry with Chertsey Cricket Club.

Coulsdon is first recorded as a cricket team in May 1769 when a combined Coulsdon and Caterham team played All-England at Smitham Bottom in nearby Croydon.  The club's last known match in 1784 was against Chertsey at Laleham Burway and they lost that by 313 runs. In most of Coulsdon's matches, the result is unknown, but the team did defeat Sussex in 1775.

One of the club's most notable players was William Palmer.

References

Further reading
 G B Buckley, Fresh Light on 18th Century Cricket, Cotterell, 1935
 H T Waghorn, The Dawn of Cricket, Electric Press, 1906

Former senior cricket clubs
English cricket teams in the 18th century
Sports clubs established in the 1760s
English club cricket teams
Cricket in Surrey